Ronald Richter (1909–1991) was an Austrian-born German, later Argentine citizen, scientist who became infamous in connection with the Argentine Huemul Project and the National Atomic Energy Commission (CNEA). The project was intended to generate energy from nuclear fusion in the 1950s, during the presidency of Juan Perón. Richter's project would deliver, according to Perón's 1951 announcements, cheap energy in half-litre and one-litre containers.

Nationality
Richter was born in Falkenau an der Eger (in Czech Falknov nad Ohří renamed Sokolov in 1948), Bohemia (now Czech Republic) while it was part of the Austrian empire. Richter was of German origin. He was naturalized as an Argentine citizen in the early 1950s; President of Argentina Juan Perón overrode Argentine law to enable this.

Education
Richter attended the German University of Prague, graduating in 1935. Sources provide variant narratives about his studies as a doctoral candidate.

According to Gambini, Richter was awarded a doctorate in natural sciences in 1955. However, another source claims that he was not awarded a doctoral degree because he had misinterpreted his research results. He had concluded that he had discovered delta rays being emitted by the earth, but in fact he had been detecting X-rays scattered by the ground.

According to his recollection, Santos Mayo had personally heard Richard Gans say:  

Kurt Sitte's recollections of Richter's research under Prof. Furth differed. He recalled:

Career

Europe

Richter worked in Germany, England and France.

In preparing his dissertation for a doctorate from the University of Prague, Richter worked at Falkenau Chemiewerke in his home town of Falkenau an der Eger (now known as Sokolov) in the Czech Republic. There he went to work with electric arc furnaces looking to develop accurate methods for measurement and control of temperatures. Richter discovered that the injection of heavy hydrogen (deuterium) caused a nuclear reaction which he could measure and gauge with Geiger counters.

During World War II Richter worked in Germany with Professor Max Steenbeck and Professor Manfred von Ardenne on a particle accelerator which after the war, the Soviets copied and coined the term Tokamak.
 
Following the end of World War II, his only known jobs were a six-month stint working on explosives and a few commercial contracts. He met the aeronautical engineer Kurt Tank in London; Tank later emigrated to Argentina, hired by Perón's government under the pseudonym of Pedro Matthies.

Argentina
On the recommendation of Kurt Tank in 1947, Richter was invited to Argentina to develop a nuclear program for General Juan Perón. He learned that a German Tokamak had been smuggled to Argentina and Perón desperately needed an expert able to bring the device back to life. Richter brought knowledge of sophisticated Nazi particle accelerator technology and was received by the German industrialist and ex-Nazi spy August Siebrecht. Siebrecht took Richter to Córdoba, where Tank was developing aircraft. Tank was interested in Richter's proposal to use nuclear energy for aircraft propulsion. Richter continued to address Tank as Prof. Dr. Pedro Matthies in his correspondence about the Huemul Project.

In 1949 Perón hired Richter, who had convinced him that he could produce controlled nuclear fusion using cheap materials in a process that could supply enormous quantities of cheap energy, a program that eventually became known as the Huemul Project. Perón's reasons for backing Richter were in line with the ideology of modernization underlying his concept of the "New Argentina"; he was not interested in the military applications of atomic energy, but saw it as a way to expand iron and steel production.

Perón believed that any project undertaken by a Nazi German scientist was bound to be successful. Due to his political disagreements with Argentine scientists of stature, such as Enrique Gaviola, Perón was reluctant to seek their advice on Richter's proposal, and he gave Richter carte blanche and appointed him as his personal representative in the Bariloche area. The total cost of the project was estimated at US$300 million (2003 value).  

In 1951 Richter announced that he had achieved controlled nuclear fusion under laboratory conditions, a claim later proven false: it transpired that Richer had simply exploded hydrogen in an electric arc.

After it became evident that Richter's project was spurious, Perón appointed a technical committee which included José Balseiro, a former faculty member at the La Plata Institute of Physics, which was to report directly to him whether Richter's project should be discontinued. The committee analyzed Richter's work and concluded that the actual temperature reached in his experiments was far too low to produce a true thermonuclear reaction. They reported their findings to Perón in September 1952; soon after that project was terminated.

After the termination of the project, Richter appears to have spent periods of time abroad, including some time in Libya. Eventually he returned to Argentina, where he died in 1991; a short announcement of his death appeared in an obituary published by Microsemanario.

Project Huemul: reactions and aftermath
On 24 March 1951 Perón announced to the international press "Argentina Produces Atomic Energy", and later decorated Richter with the Peronista Medal. Following international publicity and claims, scientists in Britain were hesitant to accept the claims of the unknown Richter without corroboration. In the US, the press discounted reports of Richter's work, but secretly the government started funding two projects, Sherwood and Matterhorn. An intelligence assessment by the US, later declassified, stated that he could possibly be a "mad genius [...], thinking in the year 1970." However, it soon became evident that the claims were spurious, and interest dried up. After Perón was deposed, the new government investigated Richter regarding 1,000 million Argentine pesos (about £25 million at the time) allocated to the project and unaccounted for, and arrested him. Nothing further was heard about him. Secret British government documents declassified under the 30-year rule in 1983 report that Perón had contemplated invading the Falkland Islands in 1951, possibly due to his confidence that Argentina would be the first country to exploit atomic energy for industrial purposes.

Biographical publications
The following are quotations from books and articles published by journalists, biographers, physicists, and historians, with sources below:

From Eva Perón (Alicia Dujovne Ortiz, 1996):  

From Juan G. Roederer (2003):

Richter, The Opera: A Musical Documentary
Ronald Richter inspired an opera, Richter: Ópera Documental de Cámara, by Mario Lorenzo and Esteban Buch, with references to the spectacular experiments. It has been performed both in Argentina (Teatro Colón) and in France (Théâtre Paris-Villette).
 
The plot develops poetically framed between the ever-present Patagonian winds of the roaring forties and the recurrent breaking of the waves of the lake on the shores of the island... until the peace is shattered by German utterances and acoustic bangs.
Summary and critique. Casullo, Eduardo. La Aventura de la Isla de la Mula: Richter.

Spectacles. Richter: Opéra documentaire de Mario Lorenzo.

Notes

References 
 Alemann, Peter (1955). Esto Es, last week of October 1955.
 Confalonieri, Orestes D. (1956). Peron contra Peron, Editorial Antygua, Buenos Aires.
 Eloy Martínez, Tomas (1996). Las Memorias del General. Editorial Planeta, Buenos Aires. . See translated excerpt, below.

 Extensive discussion in Chapter 10.

1909 births
1991 deaths
People from Sokolov
German Bohemian people
Austrian scientists
Naturalized citizens of Argentina
Austrian emigrants to Argentina
Argentine nuclear physicists